Alastair Dickenson is a silver expert. He has made regular appearances on the BBC programme Antiques Roadshow since 1992. Educated at Epsom College, he began his career in the silver trade by joining one of London's major auction houses, Phillips Fine Art Auctioneers, in 1971. By 1983 he had been appointed Head of Antique Silver at Asprey, moving up to becoming a Director of the Antiques Department in 1994. In 1996 he started up his own business in Jermyn Street.

He has lectured all over the world on 16th- to 19th-century silver and silver fakes.

References

External links
Own website

Year of birth missing (living people)
Antiques experts
Living people
Silver